The 1940 Rochdale by-election was a by-election held for the British House of Commons constituency of Rochdale in Lancashire on 20 July 1940.

Vacancy 
The seat had become vacant when the Labour Member of Parliament William Kelly, had resigned his seat in Parliament by the procedural device of accepting the post of Steward of the Manor of Northstead, a notional 'office of profit under the crown'.  Kelly had been Rochdale's MP since winning the seat from the Conservatives at the 1935 general election.

Candidates 

The Labour Party candidate was Dr Hyacinth Morgan, a doctor born in the West Indies to Irish parents, who had studied medicine in Glasgow.  After three unsuccessful attempts, he won the Camberwell North West seat at the 1929 general election, but lost it at the 1931 election.  This was his first candidacy since his defeat.

During the Second World War the political parties in the Coalition Government had agreed not to contest by-elections when a vacancy arose in any of the seats held by the other coalition parties.  Although many later by-elections were contested by independent or minor party candidates, none were nominated in Rochdale.

Result 
As there was only one candidate, no vote needed to be held, and Morgan was returned unopposed.

Aftermath 
Morgan represented the constituency until the 1950 general election, when he moved to the safer seat of Warrington. Rochdale was won by the Conservatives at the 1951 election.

See also
Rochdale (UK Parliament constituency)
Rochdale
List of United Kingdom by-elections
United Kingdom by-election records

1940 elections in the United Kingdom
1940 in England
1940s in Lancashire
Elections in the Metropolitan Borough of Rochdale
By-elections to the Parliament of the United Kingdom in Greater Manchester constituencies
By-elections to the Parliament of the United Kingdom in Lancashire constituencies
Unopposed by-elections to the Parliament of the United Kingdom (need citation)
July 1940 events